The Moonie Highway is a state highway of Queensland, Australia. Part of State Route 49, it leaves the Warrego Highway at Dalby and runs for over 290 km until it reaches St George. From there, State Route 49 continues west as the Balonne Highway. From Dalby, it continues north-east as the Bunya Highway.

The highway serves agricultural settlements as well as oil and gas fields.

Route description
The Moonie Highway is part of two of the many practicable routes from the south-east of Queensland to the south-east of South Australia. It is also on the shortest route to St George and Cunnamulla from any locality on or near the Queensland coast from Bundaberg to Coolangatta.

Dalby to Moonie
The highway leaves Dalby via Nicholson and Loudoun Streets. After about 7.8 km it crosses Myall Creek just south of its junction with the Condamine River. After a further 1.7 km it crosses the Condamine. It runs through rich farming land until it reaches the locality of Kumbarilla near the intersection with the Surat Developmental Road. Kumbarilla is located on a ridge (Kumbarilla Ridge) which divides the Surat Basin from the Clarence-Moreton Basin to the east. The road then passes by and through the Kumbarilla State Forest, an area of about 86,000 hectares of native bushland. It then passes through the Waar Waar State Forest and more farmland before reaching the Leichhardt Highway at Moonie.

Moonie to St George
From Moonie the highway passes through more farmland, passing the timbered area of Southwood National Park. It then passes through Currajong State Forest and Kinkora State Forest before reaching Westmar. From Westmar it passes through more farmland, and also Ula Ula State Forest and Alton National Park. It ends at the Carnarvon Highway, about 9.1 km from the centre of St George.

History
The first recorded European settlement in the Moonie district was in about 1849 when land at the head of the Moonie River was formed into a station and named "Weranga". The current locality of Weranga, the Weranga railway station, and the Weranga State Forest are all in the area once occupied by the station.
As further stations were formed along the Moonie River a road to access them was developed, generally following the course of the main channel of the river. This road still exists as Old Moonie Road. It runs to the north of and approximately parallel to the Moonie Highway, from Weranga to the Meandarra Talwood Road just north of Westmar. The name Westmar was derived from the first part of the words WESTern and MARanoa.

Major intersections

See also

 Highways in Australia
 List of highways in Queensland
 I've Been Everywhere - a song whose Australian version mentions Kumbarilla
 Glenmorgan railway line- which has stations at Kumbarilla and Weranga

References

Highways in Queensland